Paradise Lost is the fifth CD single by Minori Chihara. The single was used as the opening theme song to the anime Ga-rei -Zero- in which she voices the main character Kagura Tsuchimiya. Subsequently, in the 6th episode of The Melancholy of Haruhi Suzumiya-chan, the character Yuki Nagato (reprised by Minori Chihara herself) sang a muted version of Paradise Lost at the end of the episode. The single placed 15th on the Oricon charts in the month it debuted.

Track listing
"Paradise Lost"

"Paradise Lost (off vocal)"

References

Lantis (company) singles
2008 singles
Minori Chihara songs
2008 songs
Song articles with missing songwriters